The Cheryl Miller Award is an award presented annually to the best women's basketball small forward in the National Collegiate Athletic Association (NCAA) Division I competition. It is named after Hall of Famer Cheryl Miller. While at Riverside (CA) Polytechnic High School, Miller set a single game scoring record of 105 points in a game in 1982. She was a four-time All-America, a three-time Naismith Player of the Year and a Wade Trophy winner while accumulating 3,018 career points at USC from 1982 to 1986. Miller is a 1984 Olympic gold medalist and was named the best college basketball player, both male and female, in 1986 by Sports Illustrated.

Origin
The Cheryl Miller Award was first presented in 2018, when WBCA and the Naismith Hall, in collaboration with ESPN, incorporated the Nancy Lieberman Award, presented since 2000 to the top NCAA women's point guard, into a new set of awards known as the "Naismith Starting Five". All five awards are presented at the WBCA convention (except in 2020, when the convention was not held due to the COVID-19 pandemic) to players at each of the five traditional basketball positions. These awards parallel a previously existing set of men's basketball positional awards also presented by the Hall. In addition to the Lieberman Award, the other three new awards are:

 Ann Meyers Drysdale Shooting Guard Award

 Katrina McClain Power Forward Award
 
 Lisa Leslie Center Award

Selection

Winner for each of the Starting Five awards is determined by a selection committee consisting of Hall of Famers, WBCA coaching members, and media, and headed by the award's namesake. Fan voting through the Hall's website is also incorporated into the selection process.

Key

Winners

Winners by school

See also
Julius Erving Award – the counterpart to the Miller Award; given to the best men's NCAA small forward

References

External links
Official website

College basketball player of the year awards in the United States
College basketball trophies and awards in the United States
College women's basketball in the United States
Sports awards honoring women
Awards established in 2018
College sports trophies and awards in the United States